Down the River is a book by Edward Abbey, published in 1982. It is a loose collection of autobiographical and philosophical essays about the wilderness, written between 1978 and 1982.

Notes

1982 books
Philosophy books
Literary autobiographies
E. P. Dutton books
Essay collections